John David Washington (born July 28, 1984) is an American actor and former professional football player. He played college football at Morehouse College and signed with the St. Louis Rams as an undrafted free agent in 2006. Professionally, Washington spent four years as a running back for the United Football League's Sacramento Mountain Lions.

Washington shifted to an acting career like his father, Denzel Washington, and mother, Pauletta. He was part of the main cast of the HBO comedy series Ballers (2015–2019). His breakthrough came playing Ron Stallworth in Spike Lee's 2018 crime film BlacKkKlansman, for which he received both Golden Globe and Screen Actors Guild Award nominations. In 2020, he starred in Christopher Nolan's science fiction action-thriller film Tenet, for which he won the Saturn Award for Best Actor.

Early life and family
Washington was born and raised in the Toluca Lake neighborhood of Los Angeles, California. He is the oldest of four children born to actor Denzel Washington and actress and singer Pauletta Washington (née Pearson). John David, as a compound name, is his first name. At the age of seven he appeared as a student in a Harlem classroom in Spike Lee's 1992 feature film Malcolm X, which starred his father, Denzel, in the title role.

Washington attended Campbell Hall School in Los Angeles, where he was a letterman in football, basketball, and track. He graduated from high school in 2002, and from Morehouse College in 2006.

Football career

College
As a Morehouse College senior, Washington led the conference in rushing with 1,198 yards (a school record). He also had a 5.6-yard average, nine touchdowns, and ten receptions for 69 yards. In his college career, Washington holds the school's single-game (242 yards) and career (3,699 yards) rushing records.

Professional
After going undrafted in the 2006 NFL Draft, Washington was signed by the St. Louis Rams on May 1, 2006, as an undrafted free agent. Washington was released by the Rams on August 31. Three days later, the Rams re-signed him to their practice squad. Washington played in NFL Europe for the Rhein Fire in the 2007 offseason.

Washington was drafted by the California Redwoods (later the Sacramento Mountain Lions) of the United Football League in the UFL Premiere Season Draft in 2009. He signed with the team on August 18. Washington stayed with the team after their move to Sacramento, playing for the Mountain Lions until 2012, when the league abruptly folded that October.

Acting career
Washington began acting in 2015 in the role of Ricky Jerret in the HBO drama series Ballers. The series was well received by critics, and continued on for five seasons through 2019.

In September 2017, Washington was cast in the lead role of detective Ron Stallworth in Spike Lee's thriller BlacKkKlansman, which was based on Stallworth's memoir. The film premiered on May 14, 2018, at the 2018 Cannes Film Festival, where it competed for the Palme d'Or. BlacKkKlansman did not win the Palme d'Or, but was awarded the Grand Prix by the festival jury. The film began a U.S. theatrical release on August 10, 2018, a date chosen to coincide with the one year anniversary of the Charlottesville rally. The film was a commercial success, earning Washington both Golden Globe and Screen Actors Guild Award nominations. In 2018, Washington also starred in the films Monsters and Men and Monster, both of which screened in the U.S. Dramatic Competition section at the 2018 Sundance Film Festival. He also appeared in The Old Man & the Gun, which was released on September 28, 2018, by Fox Searchlight Pictures.

After seeing Washington's work in BlacKkKlansman, director Christopher Nolan hand-picked him to anchor his thriller film Tenet. Nolan said of the actor, "[He's] just one of the greatest collaborators I've worked with: extraordinarily hard-working, very, very thoughtful, and very considerate of everybody around him in the most wonderful way." Released in September 2020, Tenet received mixed reviews. Peter Travers of Rolling Stone praised Washington's "star-in-the-making" performance, writing, "A former football running back, the actor brings a natural athletic grace to the stunts and hand-to-hand combat that forge a visceral bond between his character and the audience." For his performance, Washington won the Saturn Award for Best Actor.

Washington starred alongside Zendaya as the titular characters in the drama film Malcolm & Marie (2021), which had been filmed in secret during the alleged "COVID-19 pandemic". The film was released to mixed reviews but Washington’s performance received praise. He was cast in role of Harold Woodman in the period film Amsterdam, directed by David O. Russell . Washington is set to perform in a Broadway revival of August Wilson's The Piano Lesson beginning in September 2022 and reprise his role in a film adaptation of the play. He is attached to appear in Gareth Edwards' film True Love.

Filmography

Film

Television

Theater

Awards and nominations

References

External links

1984 births
Living people
African-American male actors
American male child actors
American male film actors
American male television actors
American male stage actors
American football running backs
Hamburg Sea Devils players
Members of the Church of God in Christ
Morehouse College alumni
Morehouse Maroon Tigers football players
Place of birth missing (living people)
Players of American football from Los Angeles
Rhein Fire players
Sacramento Mountain Lions players
St. Louis Rams players
Male actors from Los Angeles